Coleophora minoica is a moth of the family Coleophoridae. It is found in Greece and on Crete.

References

minoica
Moths described in 1983
Moths of Europe